The KTM 950 Adventure is a Dual-sport motorcycle produced in Austria by KTM.

History
The story of KTM 950 Adventure started in 1992. That year, a one-off special called the Bepono, built for the German BoTT series by two engineering students by combining a pair of cylinders from a KTM LC4 single on a special crankcase, was displayed on the KTM stand at the IFMA Show in Cologne.

Although, this was just a teaser. The second time around in 1996, the Stuttgart-based design office Kraft Technik, commissioned by KTM to produce a design for a V-twin Hard Enduro, possibly using the 60-degree V-twin RSV900 Rotax engine they were developing for Aprilia. Unfortunately, the Italians refused to share it with their Austrian neighbors. An alternative was the Swedish Folan 60-degree V-twin engine, however that co-venture was aborted after KTM was successful on the stock market.

Early-1998, as the company grew in strength and the need to expand its single-cylinder range with a twin-cylinder product line, a new V-twin became a priority. Accordingly, KTM chief engineer Wolfgang Felber studied twin-cylinder engine formats and vehicle concepts.

By August 1998, the design team settled on a 75-degree V-twin design, with emphasis on light weight and compact build. To do so, KTM assumed the entire R&D process in-house, and hired Claus Holweg as Project Manager from their Austrian neighbors Rotax.

Within a year, the new 'LC8' engine line had its first dyno run on August 11, 1999.

After the successful engine development, KTM worked on the design of the body of 950 Adventure.

Development and management departments of KTM put designers and model-makers together to establish a concept vehicle. The prototype's design was completed by Kiska, design partner of KTM, and presented at Munich Motorcycle show in 2000.

After the critical votes, KTM CEO Stefan Pierer rejected the first draft of the Adventure except for a few details, chassis, and engine.

KTM's designers were innovative in defining their design, using strained and broken lines with an angular fairing. For valuable real-world experience, the engineering team asked rally pilot Fabrizio Meoni to assist.

Early-2001, engineers fabricated a frame house with ratings defined by Meoni. February 2001, he initiated a series of real-world evaluations in Tunisia.

Later that year, Fabrizio Meoni won Rallye des Pharaons 2001 following superior victory on the Dakar in 2002, confirming the 950 Adventure was ready to market.

The 950 Adventure was formally presented in at the 2003 Intermot Motorcycle show. Production of the LC8 began in February 2003.

2006, KTM stopped producing 950 Adventure. The successor was KTM 990 Adventure with slightly different displacement and fuel injectors instead of carburetors.

Suspension 
Front and rear suspensions were made by White Power ('WP') in the Netherlands, a subsidiary of KTM. Front suspensions (also known as forks) allow compression adjustment at the bottom as well as damping adjustments at the top of the forks. Spring pre-load can be adjusted by on the top cap of the forks.

Rear suspension (shock absorber) has re-bound adjustment at the bottom of the shock. High/low speed dampening are adjustable using a clicker dial and a 14mm hex at the top (High/Low speed dampening are referring to speed of compressing the spring, not speed of the motorcycle).

Rear shock on all adventure models of 950 and 990 have hydraulic pre-load adjustment accessible with a knob on the left side of the motorcycle. KTM 950 Super Enduro R version has a mechanical large nut compressing the spring instead.

Suspension Travel 

Front and rear suspension travel was changed by KTM during the production run. Seat height and ground clearance were subsequently affected.

Modifications

See also 
KTM Adventure Bikes Hall Of Wisdom (www.ktm950.info), a great source of information dedicated to KTM 950 and 990 models, summarizing valuable forum posts.

Other large dual-sport motorcycles :

BMW R1200GS
KTM 950 Super Enduro R 
Yamaha XT1200Z Super Ténéré
Ducati Multistrada 1200

References

External links

950 Adventure
Dual-sport motorcycles
Motorcycles introduced in 2003